Erwan Balanant (born 21 February 1971) is a French politician of the Democratic Movement (MoDem) who was elected to the French National Assembly on 18 June 2017, representing the department of Finistère.

In parliament, Balanant serves as member of the Committee on Legal Affairs. In 2019, he was one of only two MoDem members who voted against his parliamentary group's majority and opposed the French ratification of the European Union’s Comprehensive Economic and Trade Agreement (CETA) with Canada.

See also
 2017 French legislative election

References

1971 births
Living people
Deputies of the 15th National Assembly of the French Fifth Republic
La République En Marche! politicians
Politicians from Lorient
Rennes 2 University alumni
Deputies of the 16th National Assembly of the French Fifth Republic